Chemerin, also known as retinoic acid receptor responder protein 2 (RARRES2), tazarotene-induced gene 2 protein (TIG2), or RAR-responsive protein TIG2 is a protein that in humans is encoded by the RARRES2 gene.

Function 

Retinoids exert biologic effects such as potent growth inhibitory and cell differentiation activities and are used in the treatment of hyperproliferative dermatological diseases. These effects are mediated by specific nuclear receptor proteins that are members of the steroid and thyroid hormone receptor superfamily of transcriptional regulators. RARRES1, RARRES2 (this gene), and RARRES3 are genes whose expression is upregulated by the synthetic retinoid tazarotene. RARRES2 is thought to act as a cell surface receptor.

Chemerin is a chemoattractant protein that acts as a ligand for the G protein-coupled receptor CMKLR1 (also known as ChemR23). Chemerin is a 14 kDa protein secreted in an inactive form as prochemerin and is activated through cleavage of the C-terminus by inflammatory and coagulation serine proteases.

Chemerin was found to stimulate chemotaxis of dendritic cells and macrophages to the site of inflammation.

In humans, chemerin mRNA is highly expressed in white adipose tissue, liver and lung while its receptor, CMKLR1 is predominantly expressed in immune cells as well as adipose tissue. Because of its role in adipocyte differentiation and glucose uptake, chemerin is classified as an adipokine.

Role as an adipokine 

Chemerin has been implicated in autocrine / paracrine signaling for adipocyte differentiation and also stimulation of lipolysis. Studies with 3T3-L1 cells have shown chemerin expression is low in pre-differentiated adipocytes but its expression and secretion increases both during and after differentiation in vitro.  Genetic knockdown  of chemerin or its receptor, CMKLR1 impairs differentiation into adipocytes, and reduces the expression of GLUT4 and adiponectin, while increasing expression of IL-6 and insulin receptor. Furthermore, post-differentiation knockdown of chemerin reduced GLUT4, leptin, adiponectin, perilipin, and reduced lipolysis, suggesting chemerin plays a role in metabolic function of mature adipocytes. Studies using mature human adipocytes, 3T3-L1 cells, and in vivo studies in mice showed chemerin stimulates the phosphorylation of the MAPKs, ERK1, and ERK2, which are involved in mediating lipolysis.

Studies in mice have shown neither chemerin nor CMKLR1 are highly expressed in brown adipose tissue, indicating that chemerin plays a role in energy storage rather than thermogenesis.2

Role in obesity and diabetes 

Given chemerin's role as a chemoattractant and a recent finding macrophages have been implicated in chronic inflammation of adipose tissue in obesity. This suggests chemerin may play an important role in the pathogenesis of obesity and insulin resistance.

Studies in mice found that feeding mice a high-fat diet, resulted in increased expression of both chemerin and CMKLR1. In humans, chemerin levels are significantly different between individuals with normal glucose tolerance and individuals with type II diabetes and first degree relatives. Moreover, chemerin levels show a significant correlation with body mass index, plasma triglyceride levels  and blood pressure.

It was found incubation of 3T3-L1 cells with recombinant human chemerin protein facilitated insulin-stimulated glucose uptake. This suggests chemerin plays a role in insulin sensitivity and may be a potential therapeutic target for treating type II diabetes.

References

Further reading 

 
 
 
 

Proteins